Embleton is a civil parish in the Borough of Allerdale in Cumbria, England.  It contains 14 listed buildings that are recorded in the National Heritage List for England.  All the listed buildings are designated at Grade II, the lowest of the three grades, which is applied to "buildings of national importance and special interest".  The parish contains the village of Embleton and the settlement of Wythop Mill, and is otherwise rural.  Most of the listed buildings are houses, farmhouses and farm buildings.  The other listed buildings are a public house, a boundary stone, and two milestones.


Buildings

References

Citations

Sources

Lists of listed buildings in Cumbria